Killarney (meaning 'church of sloes') is a town in County Kerry, southwestern Ireland. The town is on the northeastern shore of Lough Leane, part of Killarney National Park, and is home to St Mary's Cathedral, Ross Castle, Muckross House and Abbey, the Lakes of Killarney, MacGillycuddy's Reeks, Purple Mountain, Mangerton Mountain, Paps Mountain, the Gap of Dunloe and Torc Waterfall. Its natural heritage, history and location on the Ring of Kerry make Killarney a popular tourist destination.

Killarney won the Best Kept Town award in 2007, in a cross-border competition jointly organised by the Department of the Environment and the Northern Ireland Amenity Council. In 2011, it was named Ireland's tidiest town and the cleanest town in the country by Irish Business Against Litter.

History

Early history and development

Killarney featured prominently in early Irish history, with religious settlements playing an important part of its recorded history.  Its first significantly historical settlement was the monastery on nearby Innisfallen Island founded in 640 by St. Finian the Leper, which was occupied for approximately 850 years.

Innisfallen (from Irish: Inis Faithlinn, meaning "Faithlinn's island") is an island in Lough Leane, one of the three Lakes of Killarney. It is home to the ruins of Innisfallen Abbey which was founded in 640 by St. Finian, and was occupied until the monks were dispossessed in 1594, by Elizabeth I, Queen of England. According to tradition, the Irish High King Brian Boru received his education at Innisfallen.

Aghadoe, the local townland which overlooks present day Killarney, may have begun as a pagan religious site.  The site has also been associated with the 5th century missionary St. Abban, but 7th century ogham stones mark the first clear evidence of Aghadoe being used as an important site.  According to legend, St. Finian founded a monastery at Aghadoe in the 6th or 7th century.  The first written record of a monastery dates from 939 AD in the Annals of Innisfallen where the Aghadoe monastery is referred to as the "Old Abbey."

Following the Anglo-Norman invasion of Ireland in 1169, the Normans built Parkavonear Castle, also at Aghadoe.  The castle was perhaps intended as an early warning outpost due to its views of the entire Killarney valley and lakes region.

Ross Castle was built on the lake shore in the late 15th century by local ruling clan the O'Donoghues Mor (Ross). Ownership of the castle changed hands during the Desmond Rebellions of the 1580s to the Mac Carty Mor.

Muckross Abbey was founded in 1448 as a Franciscan friary for the Observantine Franciscans by Donal McCarthy Mor.  The abbey was burned down by Cromwellian forces under General Ludlow in 1654, and today remains a ruin.

Killarney was heavily involved in the Irish War of Independence.  The town, and indeed the entire county, had strong republican ties, and skirmishes with the British forces happened on a regular basis.
The Great Southern Hotel was for a while taken over by the British, both as an office and barracks, and to protect the neighbouring railway station. One notable event during the war was the Headford Ambush when the IRA attacked a railway train a few kilometres from town.

However, divisions among former colleagues were quick to develop following the truce and treaty, and Killarney, like many other areas, suffered in the rash of increasing atrocities during the Civil War.  A day after the Ballyseedy massacre, five Republican prisoners were murdered in Killarney by Free State forces.

Tourism development 

Killarney's tourism history goes back at least to the mid 18th century, when Thomas, fourth Viscount Kenmare (Lord Kenmare), began to attract visitors and new residents to the town.  The date of 1747 was used in recent 250-year celebrations to honour the history of Killarney tourism.  A visit by Queen Victoria in 1861 gave the town some international exposure.

Killarney benefited greatly from the coming of the railway in July 1853. British trade directory publisher Isaac Slater noted that there were three hotels in the town in 1846 but by 1854, one year after the coming of the railway, James Fraser named seven hotels and described their locations:the Railway Hotel opposite the Railway Station; the Kenmare Arms and Hibernia which are on the main street and immediately opposite the church... the Victoria which is about a mile [1.5 km] to the west of the town on the shores of the Lower Lake; the Lake View which is about the same distance to the east of the town and also on the shore of the Lower Lake; the Muckross about two and a half miles [4 km] away and near the Muckross Lake and the Torc which occupies an elevated site about a mile and a half [2.5 km] from the town on the hill which rises immediately over the Lake Hotel.

In 1858, Irish born Victorian journalist, Samuel Carter Hall named O'Sullivan's Hotel and the Innisfallen rather than the Hibernia and Torc, but Isaac Slater also named the Hibernia in 1846. At the time he was writing, tours of the Ring of Kerry were already an industry and Killarney was considered the starting point of the  circuitous route. He was fascinated by the horses' endurance on the two-day trip, and leaves clear advice for other travellers; 
It is a common and wise custom of those who make this tour, and are not pressed for time, to hire the carriage at the hotel in Killarney and continue with it 'all the way round.' It is absolutely marvellous what these mountain bred horses can get through "thinking nothing" of thirty miles [50 km] for days together or even fifty miles [80 km] in a single day.
As part of the trip, he noted that there were hotels in Glenbeigh and  Waterville along with a "comfortable inn", which is now The Butler Arms Hotel.

Economy

Industry
Thomas Browne, 4th Viscount Kenmare founded linen mills in the 1740s as part of his efforts to increase the population and economy of Killarney. In later years, hosiery and shoe making were major industries in the town.

Modern employers include Liebherr Cranes, which has had a presence in Killarney since 1958, with a combined manufacturing/research and development facility in the town manufacturing container cranes. In honour of its founder, a street in Killarney was named Dr. Hans Liebherr Road. Other businesses include Tricel (also known as Killarney Plastics) which was founded in 1973.

In the public sector, both the Department of Tourism, Culture, Arts, Gaeltacht, Sport and Media and Department of Justice have offices in Killarney.

Tourism

Tourism is the largest industry in Killarney, generating around €410 million every year. Roughly 1.1 million tourists visit the town every year, with foreign tourists making up over 60% of all visitors.

Transport

Road
Killarney is served by National Primary Route N22 (north to Tralee and Castleisland and east to Cork); the National Secondary Routes N72 (west to Killorglin and east to Mallow, Fermoy, and Dungarvan) and the N71 (south to Kenmare and Bantry).

Rail
Killarney railway station (operated by Iarnród Éireann) has direct services to Tralee, Cork and Dublin, with connections to the rest of the rail network.

Bus
Bus Éireann provides bus services to Limerick (and onwards to Dublin), Tralee, Cork, Kenmare and Skibbereen.

Air
Kerry Airport (17 km), in Farranfore between Tralee and Killarney, provides a number of air services with connecting trains running from Farranfore railway station to Killarney railway station. Cork Airport (89 km), easily accessible by bus or rail, also serves the Kerry region.

Sport

Association football
The International Football Association Board (IFAB), the body that determines the Laws of the Game, met at the Lake Hotel in Killarney in 1905.

Killarney has three football clubs—all of which compete in the Kerry District League.

Killarney Athletic A.F.C. was founded in 1965, and played its first competitive game in the Desmond League as a youth team. It entered a junior team at the start of 1966. In the early 1970s, the club became a founding club of the Kerry District League (KDL). Originally the club played in the centre of Killarney, but have since moved to a modern facility (with two pitches) in the Woodlawn area of the town.

Killarney Celtic was founded in 1976. The club purchased their own ground in 1993 and have invested in their facilities since then. There is a grass pitch and a FIFA 1-star full-size synthetic all-weather pitch (both floodlit to match standard), a 50 x 80 meter grass training pitch and a 70 x 35 metre synthetic training pitch which is also fully floodlit.

Cedar Galaxy was formed in 2011 and play in the Kerry District League Division 2B. The team were promoted to Division 2A for the 2013/2014 campaign.

Gaelic games

The Kerry GAA branch of the Gaelic Athletic Association was founded in 1888. Kerry's county hurling and county football teams play at the Fitzgerald Stadium in Killarney, which opened in 1936 and has capacity for 43,180 spectators.

Killarney has three Gaelic football clubs: Dr Crokes, Killarney Legion and Spa. The rural hinterland has a large number of football teams, such as Kilcummin, Fossa, Firies, Glenflesk and Gneeveguilla. All these teams compete in the Kerry County league and the East Kerry Senior Football Championship (O'Donoghue Cup) and league.

Dr. Crokes is the most successful of these teams, winning the All-Ireland Senior Club Football Championship in 1992 and the Munster Senior Club Football Championship in 1991, 1990 and 2007. The club has also won the County Championship on 7 separate occasions, including in 2010. Dr. Crokes is the only club in Killarney with a hurling team; it won the Kerry Intermediate Hurling Championship in 1999 and 2001.

Rowing
There are six rowing clubs in the town, who share a common history in Ireland's oldest surviving regatta, the Killarney Regatta, which is held annually on the first or second Sunday in July. The six clubs are Commercial RC (Killarney), Flesk Valley RC, Fossa RC, Muckross RC, St. Brendan's RC and Workmen RC. The style of rowing seen at the regatta is traditional, fixed seat rowing in wide, wooden six-person boats. Since the 1980s, a number of the clubs have moved toward coastal type rowing and modern 'slide' or Olympic style rowing.

Muckross Rowing Club is the largest of the clubs, having developed into a full-time 'sliding' club with 32 National Championships (since 1996) at various levels from Junior to Senior. A number of members of the club have also been selected to row for Ireland and have competed at the Home International Regatta, Coupe de la Jeunesse, World Rowing Championships and Olympic Games. Paul Griffin, Sean Casey and Cathal Moynihan members of Muckross Rowing Club, are Olympic and Irish World Championship rowers.

Rugby
Killarney RFC play in the Munster Junior League. The club's 1st XV won promotion to Division 2 in 2009-10,. while the same season the club fielded a 2nd XV for the first time. The club has also a large youth and underage set-up catering for all young enthuasists from the town and surrounding areas.

Golf
Killarney Golf & Fishing Club attracts various national competitions such as the Irish Open.
The Ross Golf Course is a 9-hole golf course less than one mile from the centre of the town.

Other sports
Killarney Racecourse is located just outside the town and holds flat and national hunt meetings.

The Ring of Kerry Cycle, a charity cycle around the Ring (175 km) takes place every first Saturday in July. There is also a club in Killarney called Killarney Cycling Club.

St. Paul's Killarney Basketball Club, established in 1985, has youth teams and a senior national league team that plays in the Irish Basketball Division one league. Killarney is also the home of Irish floorball.

In popular culture and music 
In 1900 the composer Cyril Rootham wrote his Op.8 "Four Impressions (Killarney)" for solo violin and small orchestra. The work was never published, but Rootham later arranged the work for pianoforte duet (Op.8 No.2, unpublished) and for violin and piano (Op.8.No.3, published in 1902 as "Impressions pour Violon et Piano").

At the beginning of the 20th century, many songs which romanticized Ireland made direct mention of Killarney. Examples included "My Father Was Born In Killarney - Don’t Run Down The Irish" (1910), "Too Ra Loo Ra Loo Ral" (1914) and "For Killarney and you" (1910).

"There's Only the One Killarney" is a song that was written by Irish songwriter Dick Farrelly and recorded by Irish tenor Patrich O'Hagan. Killarney also appears in "How Can You Buy Killarney," written by Kennedy, Steels, Grant and Morrison, and recorded by Joseph Locke, among others. Killarney is also mentioned in "Christmas in Killarney" (written by Redmond, Cavanaugh and Weldon) and "Did Your Mother Come From Ireland?" (written by Kennedy and Carr), both most notably recorded by Bing Crosby. "Some Say the Devil Is Dead" by Derek Warfield contains the line "Some say the devil is dead and buried in Killarney/ More say he rose again and joined the British Army."  In the chorus of Celtic rock band Gaelic Storm's song Raised on Black and Tans, the singer declares his Irish heritage by saying "my mother’s brother’s sister’s cousin’s auntie’s Uncle Barney’s father’s brother had a cousin from Killarney."

Van Morrison references the town in the opening lines of his 1974 song "Fair Play" off of his album Veedon Fleece: "Fair play to you / Killarney's lakes are so blue / And the architecture I'm taking in with my mind / So fine."

In 2013 Colin O'Sullivan published a novel called Killarney Blues, set in his native town and for which he was awarded the "Prix Mystère de la critique" in 2018.

Notable people
Eóin Brosnan, Gaelic footballer and solicitor
Jessie Buckley, singer and actress 
Paul Coghlan, former senator
Colm Cooper,  Gaelic footballer
Edward Eagar, lawyer and convict
Michael Fassbender, actor
Thomas Fitton, cricketer and Royal Air Force officer
Dick Fitzgerald, Kerry Gaelic footballer
Hugh Kelly, writer
Seán Kelly, MEP, former President of the GAA and Chairman, Irish Institute of Sport
Mark Lanegan, American musician and author who immigrated to Killarney, where he died
Tadhg Lyne, three times All-Ireland Senior Football Championship winner with the Kerry GAA Gaelic football team
James McDonogh, first-class cricketer
Michael McElhatton, soccer player
Brendan Moloney, soccer player
Breeda Moynihan-Cronin, former TD
Michael Moynihan, former TD
Paul Nagle, rally co-driver
Peter O'Brien, Gaelic footballer
Diarmuid O'Carroll, soccer player
Monsignor Hugh O'Flaherty, Roman Catholic priest who lived in Killarney as a child
John O'Leary, former TD
Gillian O'Sullivan, former Olympian racewalker, world record holder and silver medalist at the World Athletics Championships 2003
John M. O'Sullivan, TD
Eileen Sheehan, poet

International relations

Killarney is twinned with:
 Castiglione di Sicilia, Catania, Sicily, Italy
 Pleinfeld, Bavaria, Germany
  Concord, North Carolina, United States
  Cooper City, Florida, United States
  Springfield, Illinois, United States
  Myrtle Beach, South Carolina, United States
  Scottsdale, Arizona, United States
 Kendal, Cumbria, England, United Kingdom
  Staffanstorp, Scania, Sweden
 Casperia, Rieti, Lazio, Italy

See also
 List of towns and villages in Ireland
 St Brendan's College, Killarney

References

External links

 
Towns and villages in County Kerry